Krasnoufimsk is a town in Sverdlovsk Oblast, Russia, located on the Ufa River (a tributary of the Kama),  from Yekaterinburg. Population: .

History
It was founded in 1736 as Krasnoufimskaya fortress that would defend the Ural manufactures from the raids of nearby tribes; it was granted the status of chief town of uyezd in 1781. In the beginning of the 18th century, the majority of the residents were Cossacks, bourgeois, and merchants of the third guild.

One of the main issues of the 19th century was the remoteness of Krasnoufimsk from the major cities of Perm and Yekaterinburg, and thus railroad. The town did not have any other transport links apart from unpaved roads and the river Ufa. Amongst its main economic activities at that time agriculture was considered one of the most valuable. The town's authorities strived to boost the development of industrial, agricultural, educational and medical sectors during the last quarter of 19th century by inviting some of the renowned specialists. On June 1, 1875, the first six-form real school was founded. Students could specialize either in mining or agricultural sciences.

In 1915, a railway station was finally built in Krasnoufimsk, and in 1916, railroad service was launched.

In 1930, Krasnoufimsk became the center of a large agricultural district. Significant investments in its infrastructure provided the town with a machine and tractor station, agriproducts processing plants, selective station, and other agriculture related enterprises.

During World War II, some of factories and plants were evacuated from the western regions of the Soviet Union, which amongst others included: All-Union Institute of Plant Cultivation; Kharkov Institute of Mechanics and Machine-Building; Rostov and Ryazan factories.

During the later half of the 20th century town's authorities carried on the development of comfortable housing, and agribusiness infrastructure.

The coat of arms contain silver falcon with blue eyes sitting on a gold wavy belt on a green background was approved by the decision of the Krasnoufimsk City Council No. 5/5 dd. March 29, 2002.

Administrative and municipal status
Within the framework of the administrative divisions, Krasnoufimsk serves as the administrative center of Krasnoufimsky District, even though it is not a part of it. As an administrative division, it is, together with four rural localities, incorporated separately as the Town of Krasnoufimsk—an administrative unit with the status equal to that of the districts. As a municipal division, the Town of Krasnoufimsk is incorporated as Krasnoufimsk Urban Okrug.

Economy
Economy of Krasnoufimsk is characterized by a well-balanced multi-sectoral structure. 80% of entities are private. Citizens are mainly employed in transport, communication, trade, catering and industry. Majority of output is split nearly equally between building materials production sector, woodworking industry, energy, machine-building and metal-working. Agriculture remains of great importance to the economy of the town. SMEs contribute significantly to the development of Krasnoufimsk employing 14% of economically active citizens and being the source of 7% of local budget revenues.

Transportation
Airport: regional airport of Krasnoufimsk; international airport of Koltsovo, Yekaterinburg (SVX).

Major companies

OGUP Krasnoufimsk Experimental Factory  specializes in production of stands, devices and instruments for testing, repair and adjustment of diesel engines
ZAO Krasnoufimsk Milk Plant - dairy products
OOO Zerno - bakery products
OOO SMF Sibprodmontazh - bakery products
OOO Engineering Enterprise "Technologies of Netherlands" - woodworking
OOO Krasnoufimsk Building Materials Factory - building materials
OOO Utyes - logging and woodworking
OOO Krasnoufimsk Furniture-producing Plant - furniture

Climate
Krasnoufimsk has a humid continental climate (Köppen climate classification Dfb). Precipitation is moderate, and is somewhat higher in summer than at other times of the year.

Demographics
Economically active citizens (42%) and young citizens (31.4%) dominate in the age structure of the town, with 68% citizens are involved in primary and secondary sectors, and 32% employed in tertiary sectors. Rates of unemployment show clear downward-sloping trend primarily due to active local employment policies and dynamic development of the economy.

Education
Branch of Ural State Agricultural Academy
Branch of Ural State Pedagogical University
Center for Humanitarian Services
Krasnoufimsk Agricultural College
Krasnoufimsk Professional Agricultural Lyceum
Krasnoufimsk Pedagogical College
Krasnoufimsk Trade School #115
Krasnoufimsk Trade School #97
Krasnoufimsk Medical College

References

External links
Unofficial website of Krasnoufimsk 

Cities and towns in Sverdlovsk Oblast
Krasnoufimsky Uyezd